{{DISPLAYTITLE:C16H18N2O7S2}}
The molecular formula C16H18N2O7S2 (molar mass: 414.453 g/mol) may refer to:

 Sulbenicillin
 Temocillin

Molecular formulas